Ganapathy agraharam is a village in the Papanasam taluk of Thanjavur district, Tamil Nadu, India.

Demographics 

As per the 2001 census, Eachankudi had a total population of 2596 with 1289 males and 1307 females. The sex ratio was 1014. The literacy rate was 72.78.

References 

 

Villages in Thanjavur district